The following is a list of events affecting Philippine television in 2001. Events listed include television show debuts, finales, cancellations, and channel launches, closures and rebrandings, as well as information about controversies and carriage disputes.

Events

January
 January 17–20 - running coverage of the Second EDSA Revolution of 2001 takes place in all national television stations, with ABS-CBN and GMA's regional stations broadcasting highlights of the concurrent regional rallies in their local newscasts.

February
Noli de Castro steps down as anchorman of TV Patrol (as entering first time in the politics, when he ran and won in the 2001 senate elections) and he was temporarily replaced by Henry Omaga-Diaz by next day.

April
April 22: Dream Satellite TV launched as the country's first DTH satellite TV provider and commenced commercial services, until its closure in 2017.

June
June 11: The launching of Ang Tamang Daan telecasted on DWCP-TV (SBN-21).

November
November 7: Actress Nida Blanca was killed in a parking lot in San Juan.

Premieres

Unknown
Strangebrew on UNTV 37
Fancy Lala on ABC 5
Side Stitch on ABC 5
Sigaw: The Campus Debate Series on PTV 4
Amazing Lifestyle on SBN 21
Oras ng Himala on SBN 21
Armor of God on RJTV 29
Kabalikat, Loren Legarda on ABS-CBN 2
Mission X on ABS-CBN 2
Off the Record on ABS-CBN 2
Sapul Kayo D'yan! on ABS-CBN 2
S.I.M. Scandals, Intrigues, Mysteries on ABS-CBN 2
True Crime on ABS-CBN 2
Verum EST: Totoo Ba Ito? on ABS-CBN 2
Paliwanagan on IBC 13
Saklolo Abugado on IBC 13
Viva Box Office on IBC 13
Musika Atbp. on IBC 13
Oras ng Katotohanan on IBC 13
Travel and Trade on IBC 13
This is Your Day on IBC 13
Maria del Cielo on IBC 13
The Gospel of the Kingdom with Pastor Apollo C. Quiboloy on IBC 13
Korek na Korek Ka Dyan! on GMA 7
Txtube on GMA 7
MariMar on GMA 7
Linawin Natin on IBC 13
Liwanagin Natin on Net 25
Quigley's Village on ZOE TV 11
The Working President on NBN 4/RPN 9/IBC 13
Alicia on ABS-CBN 2
Level 9 on RPN 9
That's Life on RPN 9
Becker on RPN 9
Real TV on RPN 9
Ed on RPN 9
TV Patrol Mindanao on ABS-CBN TV-4 Davao

Programs transferring networks

Finales
March 2: 
Hoy Gising! (ABS-CBN 2)
Balitang K (ABS-CBN 2)
Daniela's Diary (ABS-CBN 2)
March 9:
Rio Del Mar (GMA 7)
Today with Kris Aquino (ABS-CBN 2)
March 19: Tuwing Kapiling Ka (GMA 7)
March 22: Bubblegum Crisis Tokyo 2040 (GMA 7)
March 23:
 Saan Ka Man Naroroon (ABS-CBN 2)
 Trigun (GMA 7)
March 25: Richard Loves Lucy (ABS-CBN 2)
March 30: Good Morning, Pilipinas (PTV 4)
May 3: Assignment (ABS-CBN 2)
May 4: 
May Bukas Pa (IBC 13/RPN 9)
Julie (ABS-CBN 2)
May 11: Marinella (ABS-CBN 2)
May 26: H2K: Hati-Hating Kapatid (IBC 13)
May 30: Subic Bay (IBC 13)
June 1: TV Patrol Western Visayas (ABS-CBN TV-4 Bacolod and ABS-CBN TV-10 Iloilo)
July 5: 1 for 3 (GMA 7)
July 13:
 Pambansang Balita Ala-Una (PTV 4)
 Pambansang Balita Ala-Sais (PTV 4)
 National Network News (PTV 4)
 News Flash sa 4 (PTV 4)
July 14: Battle of the Brains (PTV 4)
August 10: Primetime Balita (RPN 9)
August 24: D Day (GMA 7)
September 3: Kaya ni Mister, Kaya ni Misis (ABS-CBN 2)
September 7: Camila (ABS-CBN 2)
September 8: Star Drama Presents (ABS-CBN 2)
September 9: Eto Na Ang Susunod Na Kabanata (ABS-CBN 2)
September 10: Kiss Muna (GMA 7)
September 29: Brigada Siete (GMA 7)
October 16: Pwedeng Pwede (ABS-CBN 2)
November 2: Kirara, Ano ang Kulay ng Pag-ibig? (GMA 7)
November 3: Campus Video (GMA 7)
November 23: Detective Conan (GMA 7)
November 30: Sa Dako Pa Roon (GMA 7)
December 26: Larawan: A Special Drama Engagement (GMA 7)

Unknown
Street Legal (PTV 4)
Online Bingo Filipino (PTV 4)
Compañero y Compañera (RPN 9)
Penpen de Sarapen (RPN 9)
Maria del Cielo (RPN 9)
Normal, Ohio (ABC 5)
Ghost Fighter (GMA 7)
Balitang Kris (ABS-CBN 2)
Barangay Dos (ABS-CBN 2)
Da Body en da Guard (ABS-CBN 2)
Katapat, Fred Lim (ABS-CBN 2)
Keep on Dancing (ABS-CBN 2)
Kontrapelo (ABS-CBN 2)
Kris & Tell (ABS-CBN 2)
Loren (ABS-CBN 2)
Pahina (ABS-CBN 2)
Pinoy Exposèd (ABS-CBN 2)
S.I.M. Scandals, Intrigues, Mysteries (ABS-CBN 2)
Verum EST: Totoo Ba Ito? (ABS-CBN 2)
The Estrada Presidency (IBC 13)
OPS-PIA: Ugnayan sa Hotel Rembrandt (IBC 13)
Paliwanagan (IBC 13)
Citizens Patrol (IBC 13)
Saklolo Abugado (IBC 13)
Gags Must Be Crazy (IBC 13)
Last Fool Show (IBC 13)
Klik na Klik sa Trese (IBC 13)
National Super Quiz Bee (IBC 13)
Bayan ni Juan (IBC 13)
Thursday Night at the Movies (IBC 13)
Viva Premiere Night (IBC 13)
Viva Proudly Presents (IBC 13)
Oras ng Himala (IBC 13)
GMA Drama Studio Presents (GMA 7)
Kahit na Magtiis (GMA 7)
What Went Wrong? (GMA 7)
The Pulpit of Christ (GMA 7)
SBN Live (SBN 21)
Niño Felipin (ABS-CBN 2)
Pura sangre (ABS-CBN 2)
South Park (Channel V Philippines)
TV Patrol Davao (ABS-CBN TV-4 Davao)

Channels

Launches

Unknown
 June: CNBC Asia on ZOE TV

Rebranded
The following is a list of television stations that have made or will make noteworthy network rebranded in 2001.

Closures

Births
January 6 - Cassy and Mavy Legaspi
February 5 - Juan Karlos Labajo, singer and actor
February 13 - Jelai Pilones, actress
March 6 - Rere Madrid, actress
March 21 - Cherryz Mendoza, singer
March 28 - Missy Quino, actress
April 27 – Akira Morishita, actor, singer, and member of BGYO
May 24 - Darren Espanto, singer
June 30 - Amanda Zamora, actress
August 16 - Lianne Valentin, actress
August 23 - Zaijian Jaranilla, actor
August 26 - Zonia Mejia, actress
October 18 - Carlos Dala, actor
November 7 - Grae Fernandez, actor
December 15 - Jelo The Weirdo, rapper and singer
December 19 - Mika Gorospe, singer

Deaths
October 3: Ricky Belmonte – Actor (b. 1947)
November 7: Nida Blanca – Actress (b. 1936)
November 23: Maria Teresa Carlson – Actress (b. 1963)

See also
2001 in television

References

 
Television in the Philippines by year
Philippine television-related lists